The 2017 East Renfrewshire Council elections took place on 4 May 2017 to elect members of East Renfrewshire Council.

Five wards were used to elect eighteen councillors, a reduction of two from 2012.

After the election, SNP and Labour formed a coalition with independent Danny Devlin.

2017 results

Note: "Votes" are the first preference votes. The net gain/loss and percentage changes relate to the result of the previous Scottish local elections on 3 May 2007. This may differ from other published sources showing gain/loss relative to seats held at dissolution of Scotland's councils.

Ward results

Barrhead, Liboside & Uplawmoor
2017: 1 x Independent, 1 x Conservative, 1 x Labour, 1 x SNP
2012-2017: New ward

Newton Mearns North & Neilston
2017: 1 x Conservative, 1 x SNP, 1 x Labour
2012-2017: New ward

Giffnock and Thornliebank
2012: 1 x Labour, 1 x Conservative, 1 x SNP
2017: 1 x Labour, 1 x Conservative, 1 x SNP
2012-2017: No Change

Clarkston, Netherlee and Williamwood
2017: 1 x SNP, 1 x Independent, 1 x Conservative, 1 x Labour
2012-2017: New ward

Newton Mearns South & Eaglesham
2017: 3 x Conservative, 1 x SNP
2012-2017: New ward

Changes since 2017
† Barrhead, Liboside & Uplawmoor Conservative Cllr Paul Aitken resigned from the Scottish Conservative & Unionist party and became an Independent on 22 January 2018.
†† Clarkston, Netherlee & Williamwood Conservative Cllr Stewart Miller resigned from the Scottish Conservative & Unionist party and became an Independent on 10 September 2020.

References

2017 Scottish local elections
2017